The 2016–17 Goa Professional League is the 19th season of the Goa Professional League, the top football league in the Indian state of Goa, since its establishment 1996. The league began on 21 August 2016 and will conclude in January 2017. The first phase of the league shall have majority of matches played at the Duler Stadium.

Sporting Goa are the defending champions.

Teams

Standings and results

Standings

Results

Top scorers

References

Goa Professional League seasons
2016–17 in Indian football leagues